Dylan Kwasniewski (born May 31, 1995) is an American real estate broker and former professional stock car racing driver. A champion in both the NASCAR K&N Pro Series East and Pro Series West, he was a developmental driver for Chip Ganassi Racing. Kwasniewski most recently drove in six races for Obaika Racing in NASCAR's Xfinity Series during the 2015 season, and he currently works as a real estate broker for Colliers International.

Racing career
Born in Norwalk, Connecticut as the oldest of four children, Kwasniewski started his career driving go-karts at the age of four, and later raced in Bandoleros and Legends cars before joining the American Speed Association Super Truck Series in 2009. The same year, Rockstar Energy Drink, based in Kwasniewski's hometown of Las Vegas, Nevada, signed on as his sponsor. In 2010, Kwasniewski raced a late model car in the Lucas Oil / Rockstar Modified Series and made the move to NASCAR the following year.

Touring series

In 2011, Kwasniewski entered the K&N Pro Series West, driving for Gene Price Motorsports in the No. 03 Chevrolet, and finished second in his debut at All American Speedway. At Colorado National Speedway, Kwasniewski won the pole position and the race, becoming the youngest driver to win a series pole and race. He won again during the season at Montana Raceway Park, and ended the season fifth in the points standings, along with nine top-tens. Kwasniewski subsequently was named Rookie of the Year. In 2012, Kwasniewski won three times at Stockton 99 Raceway, Iowa Speedway and All American Speedway, along with recording 15 top-tens. Entering the season finale at Las Vegas Motor Speedway, Kwasniewski led teammate and 2011 series champion Greg Pursley by two points, and with a second-place finish, beat Pursley for the title by six points. At 17 years, 5 months and 10 days, Kwasniewski became the youngest champion in series history, surpassing Chuck Bown's record set in 1976 at 22 years, 7 months and 11 days.

In 2012, Kwasniewski announced talks with Joe Gibbs Racing to field a car in the K&N Pro Series East for the 2013 season, but eventually joined Turner Scott Motorsports (TSM), driving the No. 98. On January 7, 2013, Kwasniewski was named to the NASCAR Next program, which documents the potential future stars in NASCAR. In his first East race at Bristol Motor Speedway, Kwasniewski led 96 of 125 laps en route to the win. Kwasniewski added to his win with victories at Iowa, Langley Speedway, Virginia International Raceway and Greenville-Pickens Speedway. At the season-ending Road Atlanta race, Kwasniewski held the points lead over Brett Moffitt by five points, but transmission problems eliminated Moffitt from championship contention, as Kwasniewski led every lap to win the East championship, becoming the first driver to win both East and West titles. During the year, Kwasniewski also ran an ARCA Racing Series race at Kansas Speedway, winning the pole and finishing fourth.

Xfinity Series

On February 3, 2014, TSM announced that Kwasniewski would enter the Nationwide Series for the 2014 season, driving the team's No. 31 Rockstar Chevrolet. In a press release regarding the news, Kwasniewski stated:

Kwasniewski was the fastest driver during the second day of Nationwide testing at Daytona International Speedway, and later entered the ARCA Racing Series' Lucas Oil 200 with TSM, winning the pole position. He finished 14th in the race. On February 21, Kwasniewski clinched the pole for the Nationwide season-opening DRIVE4COPD 300, becoming the eleventh driver in series history to win the pole in his first series start, and the youngest Nationwide pole-sitter at Daytona.

In March 2014, Kwasniewski was signed to Chip Ganassi Racing's driver development program. On May 12, Turner Scott Motorsports announced that Kwasniewski would run standalone Nationwide Series events in the team's No. 42, in which Kyle Larson was unavailable. Kwasniewski ran the No. 42 with Rockstar at Iowa in August. Kwasniewski ended 2014 with three top-tens and an 11th-place points finish.

Kwasniewski was scheduled to return to the team, which was renamed HScott Motorsports, for 2015 on a part-time basis in the No. 42. However, he and Rockstar failed to reach an agreement to continue sponsoring the car, and with Brennan Poole joining the team, his future became uncertain. As a result, Kwasniewski stated plans to raise sponsorship money to fund a car for the 2016 season. Kwasniewski was picked up by Obaika Racing to make his debut in 2015 at Mid-Ohio, eventually driving in a total of six races for the team.

Personal life
Kwasniewski is a graduate of Faith Lutheran Middle School & High School. His late father, Randy, was the former CEO of the Hard Rock Hotel and Casino. More recently, in April 2017, Kwasniewski announced on Twitter that he had joined Colliers International, working in real estate.

Motorsports career results

Career summary

NASCAR
(key) (Bold – Pole position awarded by qualifying time. Italics – Pole position earned by points standings or practice time. * – Most laps led.)

Xfinity Series

K&N Pro Series East

K&N Pro Series West

 Season still in progress
 Ineligible for series points

ARCA Racing Series
(key) (Bold – Pole position awarded by qualifying time. Italics – Pole position earned by points standings or practice time. * – Most laps led.)

References
Notes

Citations

External links

Living people
1995 births
Sportspeople from Las Vegas
Racing drivers from Las Vegas
Racing drivers from Nevada
ARCA Menards Series drivers
NASCAR drivers
American people of Polish descent
Chip Ganassi Racing drivers